Anthony Barry Richmond BSC, ASC (born 7 July 1942) is an English cinematographer, film producer, and director. He is known for his collaborations with Nicolas Roeg, which include Don't Look Now (1973), The Man Who Fell to Earth (1976), and Bad Timing (1980). He was the cinematographer for the 10-camera filming of the final Beatles film Let It Be (1970), the original footage from which was re-edited by Peter Jackson into the highly acclaimed acclaimed docu-series The Beatles: Get Back (2021). For his work on Don't Look Now, Richmond received the 1973 BAFTA for Best Cinematography. His other notable credits include the cult horror films Candyman (1992), Tales from the Hood (1995), Ravenous (1999), and Cherry Falls (2000), as well as mainstream comedies such as Legally Blonde (2001) and The Sweetest Thing (2002). His sole directorial credit is the 1985 drama Déjà Vu.

Richmond is a member of the American and British Societies of Cinematographers. He was married to actress Jaclyn Smith from 1981 to 1989, with whom he had two children. He later married film producer Amanda DiGiulio.

Filmography
Film

TV movies

External links
 
 Tony Richmond interview at Future Movies

References

1942 births
Living people
Best Cinematography BAFTA Award winners
English cinematographers
Film people from London